Ferdinand Schauss, or Schauß (27 October 1832, in Berlin – 20 October 1916, in Berlin) was a German painter who specialized in portraits, genre scenes and mythological characters.

Biography 
Schauss was the son of a Berlin merchant. Later, he studied art with Carl Steffeck at the Prussian Academy of Arts. From 1856, he continued his studies with Léon Cogniet in Paris at the École des Beaux Arts.

He travelled widely, making study trips to England, Holland, Belgium, Italy and Spain, copying portraits made by the Old Masters. In 1873 he was named a Professor at the Grand-Ducal Saxon Art School, Weimar. He held this position until 1876, then returned to Berlin

He was a regular participant in the exhibitions at the Art Academy, the Große Berliner Kunstausstellung, the Glaspalast (Munich) and at the Vienna Jahresausstellungen. Among his best known portrait sitters were Désirée Artôt and Franz Liszt.

He died, just before his 84th birthday, in Berlin.

References

Further reading 
 "Schauss, Ferdinand". In: Friedrich von Boetticher: Malerwerke des 19. Jahrhunderts. Beitrag zur Kunstgeschichte. Vol.2/2, Boetticher’s Verlag, Dresden (Online)
 "Schauss, Ferdinand." In: Hermann Alexander Müller, Hans Wolfgang Singer: Allgemeines Künstler-Lexikon. Vol.4, Rütten & Loening, Frankfurt/M. 1921 (Online).
 Richard Wrede, Hans von Reinfels (Eds.): Das geistige Berlin: eine Encyklopädie des geistigen Lebens Berlins. Vol. 1, Storm, Berlin 1897, reissued 1975, Zentralantiquariat der DDR 
 Walther Scheidig: Die Geschichte der Weimarer Malerschule 1860–1900. Seemann, Leipzig 1991, .

External links 

1832 births
1916 deaths
19th-century German painters
19th-century German male artists
German portrait painters
German genre painters
Artists from Berlin
20th-century German painters
20th-century German male artists